Luigi Mocenigo may refer to:
 Alvise I Mocenigo, doge of Venice 1570–1577
 Alvise II Mocenigo, doge of Venice 1700–1709